The genus Chilonatalus of funnel-eared bats is found in South America and the Antilles. It has three species. New mitochondrial and nuclear DNA sequences that were analyzed with published morphological data to see the relationship of extinct natalids. It was found that this fossil taxon's phylogeny that was based on morphological data can be assumed that the Chilonatalus microp is and one other species is a widespread species

References

 
Bat genera
Taxa named by Gerrit Smith Miller Jr.
Taxonomy articles created by Polbot